Cape Paryadin is a headland which forms the southernmost point of the west tip of South Georgia. It was discovered in 1775 by a British expedition under James Cook. The cape was resighted in 1819 by a Russian expedition under Bellingshausen, who named it for Yakov Poryadin, navigator on the Vostok. The spelling "Paryadin" for the cape has become established through long usage.

See also
Andrews Rocks
Greene Inlet
Waring Rocks

References
 

Headlands of South Georgia